Kes (commonly known as Kes the Band or KTB) is a Trinidadian  soca group formed in 2005, and known for their unique blend of soulful vocals, calypso inspired melodies, rock riffs and island beats, with hints of reggae. The band hails from the twin island Republic of Trinidad and Tobago and consists of founding members, brothers Kees Dieffenthaller (lead vocals), Hans Dieffenthaller (drums), and Jon Dieffenthaller (guitar), along with long-time friend Riad Boochoon (bass guitar). Kes’ style has elevated them to mainstream popularity, allowing Kes to become a household name in their country and throughout the Caribbean circuit. The band constantly captivates and wins over their audiences, with their electric and high-energy performances.

Kees Dieffenthaller has collaborated with major industry talents such as songwriter Desmond Child.  Kees and Child joined forces to produce a song for the album of Ace Young who appeared on the fifth season of American Idol. In 2011, the title song from their fourth album Wotless, was one of the most popular songs for Trinidad and Tobago's Carnival. "Wotless" was created through a collaboration between Kes and Trinidadian born singer/songwriter/producer Kerwin Dubois. Kees was crowned King of International Soca Monarch at the International Soca Monarch competition that year. "Wotless" was also nominated for a BET Soul Train Music Awards in the same year, for the category of best Caribbean Performance. Kes released their fifth album, Stereotype, in August 2011, which included the track "Loving You", a collaboration between Kes and Jamaican songstress Tessanne Chin, winner of Season 5, The Voice.

In 2012, Kes teamed up with Snoop Dogg on a remix of their carnival release "Stress Away". The single was well received and marked new territory for the band.

In 2014, Kes hosted their first annual concert which bears the namesake of their track "Tuesday on the Rocks". The concert is held annually on the Tuesday before Trinidad and Tobago Carnival and features a cast of popular international, regional and local artists.

The band has performed and sold out some prestigious venues in New York City such BB Kings (2013) and the PlayStation Theater (formerly known as the Best Buy Theater) in Times Square (2012). Kes has released six albums to date, Three Baldheads and a Dread, Lion, On in 5, Wotless, Stereotype and Wired. On 9 June 2016, Kes released their international single "Major" from their upcoming album Windows to the World.

History
Hans, the oldest of the three Dieffenthaller brothers, discovered his talent for playing the drums at the age of 10. He and his younger brother Jon were asked by a childhood friend to form a band.  Jon joined the band as a bass player at the age of seven where he found his love for music. Although these youngsters had musicians for their garage band, they needed a lead singer. At the age of five, Kes had been a member of numerous choirs, theatre productions, and other musical projects he became the lead singer of his brother's band at the age of six. Performances were usually held on a stage that was built in the backyard of the Dieffenthaller home. These talented brothers eventually outgrew their first band, however, their musical abilities would continue to grow.

Kees's parents encouraged him to explore and develop his craft and at the age of 13, he formed an R&B group called KLAS, and the group performed material that was composed by Kes.

Hans, Jon and Kees Dieffenthaller attended Presentation College, San Fernando where they met Riad Boochoon. Riad, who as a classically trained pianist shared a mutual interest in music, which sealed the relationship with the Dieffenthaller brothers. Hans, Jon, Kees and Riad continued their passion for music and their love of performing by becoming involved with several musical ventures which included the Anchorage Pop/Rock award-winning band, Limestone, and the dynamic, fusion band Rydimorai.

Music

2006–2007
In 2006, Kes launched their debut album titled Three Baldheads and a Dread (a reference to the hairstyles of the band members). This album featured tracks such as "Stay with Me" and "Heads High". "Stay with Me" retained the number one position on the Toronto website charts for nine straight weeks, a new record for the band. The track, "The Calling" was featured on the soundtrack for the EA Sports FIFA 2006 Edition.

2007–2008
Kes released their second album, Lion, in 2007. The title song was popular among fans due to its inspiring and motivational lyrics.  "My Land" a collaboration with Nadia Batson was a hit during the carnival season that year. "My Land" placed Kes and Nadia second in the Trinidad and Tobago International Soca Monarch Competition. Kes released other tracks such as "Our Prayer", and reggae influenced songs "Limin" and "Bigger Brighter Day" from this album which received heavy rotation on local radio stations. Later in 2007, Kes released tracks that were more diverse, such as "Come a Little Closer" which also dominated local radio stations. In 2008, Kes’ carnival releases included "Right Dey" and "De Remedy". Kes also released their music video for the single "Lion" in May. Kees joined forces with major industry songwriter Desmond Child. Kees and Desmond produced a song for the new Ace Young album. Ace Young appeared on the fifth season of American Idol.

2009–2010
The band's third album, On In 5, was released on 10 February 2009. On In 5 featured a mix of new and old releases as well as live performances. In 2010, the band's song "Let Me Know" was selected by Six Flags and was played throughout their amusement parks.  "Let Me Know" was also chosen by American Airlines and was played during their programmes. In this year, Kes performed live on BBC World Channel. This was a significant achievement for the band as the programme was viewed by millions worldwide. The band acquired international attention and several awards including the USA 4 Real "Most Promising Artist" Award for their song "Stalker", a track released from On In 5.

2011–2012
In 2011, Kes continued to show growth with the release of their fourth album Wotless. The album's title song was one of the most popular during the Trinidad and Tobago's 2011 carnival season as well as many other carnivals in the Caribbean.  "Wotless" was created from collaboration between Kes and Trinidadian born singer/songwriter/producer Kerwin Dubios. Kees won the International Groovy Soca Monarch competition that year with "Wotless", following a performance on Carnival Friday (Fantastic Friday) at the Hasely Crawford Stadium, Trinidad.  "Wotless" was also nominated for a BET Soul Train Music Award in 2011. "Wotless" maintained a steady position on the iTunes world charts in 2011 reaching to number six on the chart. In September of that year, Kes was featured on Fox5 Good Day New York making them the first Caribbean band to perform on their programme. The Wotless album produced many favourites during the carnival season such as "Where Yuh From" (an anthem piece promoting national pride) produced by Kes and Madmen Productions, "Ah Ting" featuring Kerwin Dubios and "Come Gyal" which was produced by Kes and 1st Klase Productions.

Kes released their fifth album, Stereotype, in August 2011. Stereotype was an experimental album which showcased the band's versatility. Stereotype is a combination of Caribbean rhythms, pop music and R&B. Featured tracks on the album include "Let me Know", "Take me Away" and "Loving You", a collaboration between Kes and Jamaican songstress, winner of The Voice, Tessanne Chin. The album was produced alongside the Madmen Production team. The music video for "Take Me Away" was selected as a finalist in the International Song Writing Competition. In 2012, Kes collaborated with Snoop Dogg on the remix of their carnival release "Stress Away" (produced by Kes and 1st Klase). The single was well received and marked new territory for Kes. The band also began raising the bar locally with respect to music videos, with the release of the video for "Stress Away" (original version) in February 2012. Kes released their sixth album entitled Wired in February 2012, which included tracks such as "Precision Wine" "Stress Away" and "Coming Over" which were heavily rotated on local radio stations.

2013 – 2014
The music video for "Stress Away" was selected to appear in the 2013 BBC Music Video Festival. In 2013, the band released the well-received track "Tuesday on the Rocks" off the Bambino Musik's "Gyall Season Riddim". The groovy, pop-reggae inspired track remains one of the band's more popular songs, and has inspired the band's annual concert "Tuesday on the Rocks", which is held on the Tuesday before Trinidad and Tobago Carnival. The concert began in 2014 and continues to grow every year. The show features a cast of popular international and regional acts, young, up and coming artists, as well as local favourites.

2014 ushered in another hit for the band, by way of the Ricky Blaze produced track "Endless Summer" on the "Uptown Julie Riddim". The Fader described "Endless Summer" as an easy-on-the-ear, yet heavy-on-the-rum soca music tune. The band collaborated with noted photographer and film director, Johnathan Mannion for the music video, which also features cameo appearances by Anya Ayoung Chee, winner of Project Runway, season nine and Major Lazer member, Jillionaire. In that year Kes, collaborated with Jamaican reggae singer Gyptian, on a track entitled "Wet Fete" which was featured on Gyptian's album, Sex Love & Reggae. Kees appeared alongside Gyptian for the music video of "Wet Fete" which was filmed in Tobago.

2017
Carnival, proved to be another successful year for Kes, as their music was well received locally and throughout the Caribbean. Tracks such as "Wine up", "Incredible", "How We Like it" and "Ramp Up" were in heavy rotation on local radio stations.  2017 also saw two major collaborations between Kes and Kernal Roberts on the track entitled "Shake", and "Workout" which featured Nailah Blackman. "Workout", a mixture of Soca music and Afrobeat quickly became one of the more popular songs coming out of Trinidad and Tobago Carnival 2017, generating over 3,000,000 views on YouTube. During his performance at "Tribe Ice" (Fete), Kees invited Jamaican Olympic Games gold medalist Usain Bolt on stage side during his segment with Kernal Roberts. This caused a buzz in the international community as video footage of this event was featured on popular gossip blogs.

The Florida Caribbean Students Association featured Kees as their keynote speaker of the 43rd annual Leadership Conference, which was held at the University of Florida in March 2017.  Kees delivered his remarks on his life's work in music and business, and served as a guest judge at the FCSA annual Banquet and Miss FCSA Pageant.

Another artist pairing occurred at the Decibel Entertainment Exposition in Trinidad in May, 2017. Will Smith, who was a featured speaker at the event, made a surprise appearance during Kes’ performance. Will performed a medley of his hit songs while accompanied by Kes.

Performance 
Kes live shows incorporate additional musicians Mario Callender (keyboards), Robbie "Styles" Persaud (DJ and samples), Ricardo Rameshwar (keyboards and musical director) and Aaron Vereen (percussion).  For Kes and other local acts the Trinidadian Carnival season, which typically starts from Boxing Day until the beginning of Lent, is usually the most hectic and demanding period. Thousands of visitors arrive for the annual festival and weeks of concert events. Though each Kes performance is highly energetic, it is common during this period to perform two or three shows nightly. During the carnival festival, Kes also makes multiple appearances and performances on various music trucks as masqueraders and spectators parade thought the streets. Kes has performed all over the Caribbean, United States, Canada, Europe and parts of Asia including Japan and China. The band has opened for acts such as Sugar Ray (2005), Musiq Soulchild (2008), Sean Paul, Rihanna, (2006), John Legend (2006), Maroon 5 (2010), Evanescence (2011) and Ne-Yo (2013). In 2016, Kees shared the stage with British music sensation, Joss Stone, where they sang a duet, of their carnival 2016 hit song, "For the Love of the Music".

Discography
Three Baldheads and A Dread (2006)
Lion (2007)
On In 5 (2009)
Wotless (2011)
Stereotype (2011)
Wired (2012)

Collaborations
"Jepp Sting Naina" - Kes ft. Hunter (Lalchan Babwa) and Ravi Bissambhar
"Tessanne Chin" - Lovin' You
"Wet Fete" - Kes ft. Gyptian
"Ah Ting" - Kes and Kerwin DuBois
"Heaven" ft. Nadia Batson 
"Stress Away"-Kes ft. Snoop Dogg.
"Head Bad On De Road" ft. Michelle X
"Island love" ft. Jenna De Leon 
"Body Talk" ft. Chris Hierro
"Work Out" ft. Nailah Blackman 
"Shake" ft. Kernal Roberts
"Go Dung" with Major Lazer
"Close To Me" - Kes and Shenseea
"Mrs. Parker" - Rooftop ReP and Kes 
"Stage Gone Bad"- Kes and Iwer George
"Dear Promoter" - Voice and Kes
"Baila Riddim Mega Mix" - Motto, Kes & Skinny Fabulous
" Magic "- Kes and Jimmy October ft (feat. Etienne Charles)
 " Liki Tiki"- Kes ft J.Perry (prod by Michael Brun)

References

Trinidad and Tobago musical groups
Musical groups established in 2005
2005 establishments in Trinidad and Tobago